The Former Fire Hall No. 3 is a municipal designated historic building located in the Nutana neighborhood of Saskatoon, Saskatchewan, Canada.  

With the University of Saskatchewan being built on the east side of the river this enhanced the need for a new fire hall on the east side.  Built in 1911 with the latest equipment and both horse drawn and gasoline-powered fire fighting equipment the facility was again modernised in 1926.  In 1958 the fire department left the facility for a new Fire Hall #3 that was constructed on York Avenue and Taylor Street. 

During the Cold War, the building became the headquarters for the Department of Civil Defense in 1959. The basement was converted into a radiation-proof communications bunker, and an emergency food kitchen was constructed, to be used in the event of nuclear war.  

Today the building is privately owned and houses a bar and restaurant.

References

Buildings and structures in Saskatoon
Fire stations completed in 1911
Nuclear bunkers in Canada
Defunct fire stations in Canada
1911 establishments in Saskatchewan